Tempted Champions is an original novel based on the U.S. television series Buffy the Vampire Slayer.

Plot summary

A young, vicious and beautiful woman named Celina comes to Sunnydale and there's nothing but an uproar caused by her appearance. She's a deadly fighter that is willing to kill both humans and vampires alike. Upon her arrival in Sunnydale, she scares Anya, demanding to know where the Slayer is. As Buffy becomes involved in a short battle with Celina at sunrise, she realizes that she's in way over her head as Celina's method of fighting is far superior to her own. Meanwhile, Anya wrestles with her humanity and realizes that a lot of pain can come from being human and no longer immortal. D'Hoffryn offers her back her demonhood and she must decide which path is right for her. Buffy, after her encounter with the violent Celina, has Giles research who this mysterious woman is to better prepare her for the next time they meet. Unfortunately, the news of what Celina actually IS, is a lot more shocking than Buffy had expected.

Continuity

Fits into an alternative Buffy season 5. Written before "Hell Bells". That episode made much of this book uncanonical.

Canonical issues

Buffy books such as this one are not usually considered by fans as canonical. Some fans consider them stories from the imaginations of authors and artists, while other fans consider them as taking place in an alternative fictional reality. However unlike fan fiction, overviews summarising their story, written early in the writing process, were 'approved' by both Fox and Joss Whedon (or his office), and the books were therefore later published as officially Buffy/Angel merchandise.

External links

Reviews
Litefoot1969.bravepages.com - Review of this book by Litefoot
Teen-books.com - Reviews of this book
Nika-summers.com - Review of this book by Nika Summers*Shadowcat.name - Review of this book

2002 American novels
Books based on Buffy the Vampire Slayer